Frank William Peek Jr. (August 20, 1881, Mokelumne Hill, California – July 27, 1933, near Gaspé, Quebec) was an American electrical engineer and inventor, known as a pioneer in engineering research on the creation of extremely high voltage electricity. He is often given the sobriquet "inventor of man-made lightning". He is known for Peek's law.

Biography
Peek graduated in 1905 with a bachelor's degree from Stanford University and in 1911 with a master's degree in electrical engineering from Schenectady's Union College. He then became a consulting and research engineer for General Electric (GE) in Pittsfield, Massachusetts.

In June 1931 Harris J. Ryan and Herbert Hoover offered Peek the chair of the Engineering College of Stanford University, but he rejected the offer in favor of "the top engineering job at GE".

Peek patented inventions related to electrical transmission, insulation, and protective devices. He did fundamental research on laws of corona discharge, as well as transient phenomena and electrical transmission. He was elected in 1922 a fellow of the American Physical Society. He was awarded in 1923 the Thomas Fitch Rowland Prize of the American Society of Civil Engineers and in 1926 the Louis E. Levy Medal of the Franklin Institute.

On August 9, 1913, in Oswego, New York, he married Merle A. Bell, who was a graduate of Syracuse University. In 1933, Frank and Merle Peek were on a trip to Canada when their automobile was struck by a locomotive at a grade-crossing — he was killed and she was injured.

Selected publications

Articles

Books
  (1st edition, 1915)

References

1881 births
1933 deaths
American electrical engineers
20th-century American inventors
Stanford University alumni
Union College (New York) alumni
General Electric employees
Fellows of the American Physical Society
People from Calaveras County, California